An antral follicle, also known as Graafian follicle and tertiary  follicle, is an ovarian follicle during a certain latter stage of folliculogenesis.

Definitions differ in where the shift into an antral follicle occurs in the staging of folliculogenesis, with some stating that it occurs when entering the secondary stage, and others stating that it occurs when entering the tertiary stage.

Appearance
The antral follicle is marked by the formation of a fluid-filled cavity adjacent to the oocyte called the antrum. The basic structure of the mature follicle has formed and no novel cells are detectable. Granulosa and theca cells continue to undergo mitosis concomitant with an increase in antrum volume. The Graaf follicle reaches its maximum diameter (20–22 mm) during ovulation. Antral follicles can attain a tremendous size that is hampered only by the availability of follicle stimulating hormone (FSH), which it is dependent on in this stage of folliculogenesis.

By command of an oocyte-secreted morphogenic gradient, the antral follicle's granulosa cells begin to differentiate themselves into four distinct subtypes: corona radiata that surrounds the zona pellucida, membrana that is interior to the basal lamina, periantral that is adjacent to the antrum, and cumulus oophorus that connects the membrana and corona radiata granulosa cells together. Each type of cell behaves differently in response to FSH.

Endocrine properties
Theca cells express receptors for luteinizing hormone (LH). LH kicks off the production of androgens by the theca cells, most notably androstenedione, which are aromatized by granulosa cells to produce estrogens, primarily estradiol. Consequently, estrogen levels begin to rise.

Antral follicle count 
The antral follicle count (AFC) is the number of antral follicles, generally in both ovaries taken together if not specified otherwise. It can be determined by transvaginal ultrasonography.

A low AFC is a major factor in the diagnosis of poor ovarian reserve, that is, low fertility characterized by low numbers of remaining oocytes in the ovaries, usually accompanied by high follicle stimulating hormone (FSH) levels. Several studies show that an AFC test is more accurate than basal FSH testing for older women (< 44 years of age) in predicting IVF outcome. However, it does not appear to add any predictive information about success rates of an already established pregnancy after IVF.

It is also a major determinant of the success of ovarian hyperstimulation.

It has been suggested that counting the antral follicles measuring 2–5 or 4–6 mm in diameter is preferable. On the other hand, the number of smaller antral follicles (2–5 mm) is highly correlated with the total number of antral follicles (2–10 mm), and therefore it is suggested that counting all identifiable antral follicles of 2–10 mm in diameter would provide the most practical method for assessment of AFC in clinical practice.

Three-dimensional (3D) automated follicular tracking is a developing technique that can substantially decrease both
intra- and inter-observer variability in estimating the AFC.

References

Reproduction in mammals